Eupholini is a weevil tribe in the subfamily Entiminae.

Genera 
 Celebia
 Episomellus
 Eupholus
 Gymnopholus
 Monoscapha
 Penthoscapha
 Rhinoscapha

References 

 Alonso-Zarazaga, M.A.; Lyal, C.H.C. 1999: A world catalogue of families and genera of Curculionoidea (Insecta: Coleoptera) (excepting Scolytidae and Platypodidae). Entomopraxis, Barcelona.  
 Riedel, A. 2009: Revision of the genus Penthoscapha Heller (Coleoptera, Curculionoidea, Entiminae, Eupholini) with notes on the genera of Eupholini from New Guinea. Zootaxa, 2224: 1-29

External links 

Entiminae
Beetle tribes